Jazz ambassadors is the name often given to jazz musicians who were sponsored by the US State Department to tour Eastern Europe, the Middle East, central and southern Asia and Africa as part of cultural diplomacy initiatives to promote American values globally.

Starting in 1956, the State Department began hiring leading American jazz musicians such as Louis Armstrong, Dizzy Gillespie, Dave Brubeck, Benny Goodman and Duke Ellington to be "ambassadors" for the United States overseas, particularly to improve the public image of the US in the light of criticism from the Soviet Union around racial inequality and racial tension.

Background 
In the early 1950s, against the backdrop of the civil rights movement, decolonialisation and the Cold War, U.S. policy makers realised a new approach to American cultural diplomacy was needed. President Eisenhower was particularly concerned with how internal race relations affected America's international reputation. He saw the Cold War as a battle of ideas and that a cultural exchange program could address some of these concerns. Congress formalised the President’s Special International Program for Participation in International Affairs, also known as the Cultural Presentations Program, in 1956. U.S. officials explained that the main purpose of the program was to "counteract Russian propaganda".

The program was supervised by the State Department, who had final approval over artist selection,  and the American National Theatre and Academy (ANTA). The program was also sponsored by the government owned broadcaster Voice of America (VOA). While the program included a wide variety of cultural and artistic forms, jazz was quickly embraced by the State Department due to being an indigenous American artform. Jazz's association with African-Americans, as well as its racially mixed bands, also meant it could serve as a demonstration of racial equality and harmony. The State Department made sure that selection panels only chose suitable artists, taking into account their musicianship, "Americanness" and integrity as well as the personal character and racial make-up of their bands.

Jazz ambassador tours

First tours: 1956-1958 
Dizzy Gillespie headed the first State Department sponsored tour in March 1956 which lasted for ten weeks. Democratic Congressman Adam Clayton Powell Jr. had long been an advocate for including jazz in cultural tours and was crucial in setting up Gillespie's tour.  An 18-piece interracial band led by Gillespie, with Quincy Jones as music director, performed across Europe, Asia and South America including Iran, Pakistan, Lebanon, Turkey, Yugoslavia, Greece and Argentina. An American ambassador reported back that "we could have built a new tank for the cost of this tour, but you can't get as much goodwill out of a tank as you can out of Dizzy Gillespie's band." The Gillespie’s tour was successful in improving America's reputation and created a template for subsequent tours by other musicians. However, Gillespie drew criticism for reports that while touring Brazil he had prioritised associating with local musicians over attending official events. He did not perform for the State Department again for over a decade.

For the next jazz ambassador tour, the State Department used Benny Goodman. In December 1957, Goodman's band began a seven week tour of East and Southeast Asia. Goodman's tour was useful not only for its impact on the general public but also for strengthening American ties to the rulers of the countries he visited. While in Thailand, Goodman made a significant impression on King Bhumibol Adulyadej, himself a musician and jazz enthusiast, with the king playing with Goodman's band. Goodman promoted the idea that racism had already been defeated in America. Goodman later said "I was constantly asked by the press over there about the colored people here. [...] I guess they had been fed a lot of Communist propaganda". Much like Gillespie's tour, Goodman's tour was a diplomatic success. Following the tour, Goodman, the child of Russian immigrants, unsuccessfully tried to gain an invitation to tour in the Soviet Union.

Dave Brubeck's quartet toured for the State Department in 1958. He played in East Germany and Poland (both members of the Warsaw Pact) before touring Turkey, Afghanistan, Pakistan, India and Sri Lanka. Although the tour was scheduled to end, Secretary of State John Dulles extended the tour and cancelled the groups engagements in the United States. The band played in Iran and then travelled to Iraq. They received no briefing on the political situation in Iraq but the musicians could sense the dangerous situation in the country. Only a few weeks after Brubeck had departed, Abd al-Karim Qasim overthrew the monarchy in a coup d'état.

Later tours 
A few years later, when Louis Armstrong arrived in the Congo as part of a tour through Africa, drummers and dancers paraded him through the streets on a throne. When he played in Katanga Province, a truce was called in a long-standing civil war, so combatants on both sides could go see him play.

Since then, the Bureau of Educational and Cultural Affairs in the US State Department has sponsored the Jazz Ambassadors in partnership with the John F. Kennedy Center for the Performing Arts. Alongside performances, they also conduct master classes and lecture-recitals for local musicians in addition to performing public concerts. The State Department also sponsors hip-hop artists, particularly in the Middle East, for similar purposes.

Cultural legacy 
The jazz ambassador tours exposed the American musicians to new musical styles and traditions from the countries they visited. Duke Ellington's albums Far East Suite, Latin American Suite and Afro-Eurasian Eclipse were inspired by his tours as a jazz ambassador. Dizzy Gillespie's composition "Rio Pakistan" was similarly inspired by his 1956 tour. Several albums recorded during Gillespie's tours were released including Dizzy in Greece and World Statesman. Dave Brubeck's 1958 Jazz Impressions of Eurasia spawned from the music he had heard while touring as a jazz ambassador. The syncopated rhythms Brubeck heard from Turkish street musicians inspired his standard Blue Rondo à la Turk.

Dave Brubeck, who participated in the project, was critical of the experience. He and his wife Iola Brubeck later wrote a musical, The Real Ambassadors, based on his experiences.

See also 

 United States Army Field Band

References

United States Department of State
American jazz
Goodwill ambassador programmes
Bureau of Educational and Cultural Affairs

Sources 

 Davenport, Lisa E., (2009). Jazz Diplomacy: Promoting American in the Cold Ear, University Press of Mississippi
Von Eschen, Penny, (2006). Satchmo Blows Up the World: Jazz Ambassadors Play the Cold War, Harvard University Press